Iparía District is one of the seven districts of the province Coronel Portillo in Peru.

References

Districts of the Coronel Portillo Province
Districts of the Ucayali Region